Frankline Okoye Chinaecherem (born 6 May 1999) is a Nigerian footballer who plays as a centre-back for Finnish club FF Jaro.

Club career

KuPS
On the last day of the January 2018 transfer market, Okoye joined Finnish club KuPS on a three-year deal, until the end of 2020. Okoye played the 2018 season for KuPS' farm team, KuFu-98, who played in the Kakkonen. Okoye made 15 appearances for the team in the 2018 season.

Okoye's contract with KuPS was terminated by the end of the year.

Tammeka
After leaving KuPS, Okoye went to Estonia and joined Tartu JK Tammeka on a trial period in the beginning of 2019. In February, it was reported, that Okoye wouldn't get a contract with the club. However, one month later, in March 2019, it was confirmed that he had signed an official deal with the club.

19-year old Okoye quickly became a key player for the club and made 27 league appearances in the 2019 season, 20 of the from start, and scored three goals.

IFK Mariehamn
In December 2019, Okoye returned to Finland to join Veikkausliiga club IFK Mariehamn on trial. On 2 January 2020, he signed a permanent deal until the end of 2021, with an option for one further year.

Jaro
On 27 January 2022, he signed with Jaro for the 2022 season.

References

External links
 

Living people
1999 births
Nigerian footballers
Nigerian expatriate footballers
Association football defenders
Kakkonen players
Esiliiga players
Meistriliiga players
Veikkausliiga players
SC Kuopio Futis-98 players
Tartu JK Tammeka players
IFK Mariehamn players
FF Jaro players
Expatriate footballers in Finland
Nigerian expatriate sportspeople in Finland
Expatriate footballers in Estonia
Nigerian expatriate sportspeople in Estonia